The Journal of Medieval History is a major international academic journal devoted to all aspects of the history of Europe in the Middle Ages.

Each issue contains 4 or 5 original articles on European history, including the British Isles, North Africa, and the Middle East, in the time period between the Fall of Rome and the Renaissance.

All articles are peer reviewed by at least two referees. The journal's editorial board includes academics from multiple countries.

References

External links

 Electronic archives

European history journals
Publications established in 1975
Medieval studies literature
Elsevier academic journals
Multilingual journals
Quarterly journals